Beautemps-Beaupré is a ship of the French Naval Hydrographic and Oceanographic Service, named after the hydrographer Charles-François Beautemps-Beaupré. It replaced Espérance, decommissioned in 2000. the vessel was launched on 26 April 2002 and entered service on 13 December 2003.

Survey ships of the French Navy
2002 ships
Ships built in France